The 2005 NCAA Division I Women's Lacrosse Championship was the 24th annual single-elimination tournament to determine the national champion of Division I NCAA women's college lacrosse. The championship game was played at Navy–Marine Corps Memorial Stadium in Annapolis, Maryland during May 2005. All NCAA Division I women's lacrosse programs were eligible for this championship, and a total of 16 teams were invited to participate.

Northwestern defeated Virginia, 13–10, to win their first national championship. This would subsequently become the first of Northwestern's seven national titles in eight years (2005–2009, 2011–12). Furthermore, the Wildcats' championship secured an undefeated season (21–0) for the team.

The leading scorer for the tournament was Cary Chasney from Virginia (17 goals). Kristen Kjellman, from Northwestern, was named the tournament's Most Outstanding Player.

Qualification
A total of 16 teams were invited to participate. 9 teams qualified automatically by winning their conference tournaments while the remaining 7 teams qualified at-large based on their regular season records.

Play-in game

Teams

Tournament bracket

All-tournament team 
Erin Osborn, Dartmouth
Devon Wills, Dartmouth
Leigh Jester, Duke
Kristen Waagbo, Duke
Sarah Albrecht, Northwestern
Kristen Kjellman, Northwestern (Most outstanding player)
Ashley Koester, Northwestern
Courtney Koester, Northwestern
Lindsey Munday, Northwestern
Amy Appelt, Virginia
Cary Chasney, Virginia
Nikki Lieb, Virginia

See also 
 NCAA Division II Women's Lacrosse Championship 
 NCAA Division III Women's Lacrosse Championship
 2005 NCAA Division I Men's Lacrosse Championship

References

NCAA Division I Women's Lacrosse Championship
NCAA Division I Women's Lacrosse Championship
NCAA Women's Lacrosse Championship